Soldiers at War is a turn-based tactics game set in World War II. The player takes control of eight-man squads through the campaign of fifteen historically based missions, starting in North Africa and ending in Germany. Soldiers gain experience with time and can take items with them onto the next mission. The game also features a selection of single play stand-alone missions and a scenario editor. The multiplayer mode allows up to four people to participate in competitive games via LAN or online.

Gameplay
The player must select their squad from a group of 32 men, each with different skill levels, and then equip them for according to their role in the squad and objectives of the mission. The game is played from an isometric perspective, and layers of terrain can be removed in order to see inside buildings or behind other objects. The campaign is played from the perspective of American forces during World War II.

References

External links 
 IGN review
Review in Backstab #10

1998 video games
Computer wargames
Strategic Simulations games
Turn-based tactics video games
Video games developed in the United States
Windows games
Windows-only games
World War II video games